The Combine is a fictional multidimensional empire which serves as the primary antagonistic force in the 2004 video game Half-Life 2, and the subsequent episodes developed by Valve. The Combine consist of organic, synthetic, and heavily mechanized elements. They are encountered throughout Half-Life 2 and its episodic sequels, as well as Half-Life: Alyx, as hostile non-player characters as the player progresses through the games in an effort to overthrow the Combine occupation of Earth.

The Combine are frequently shown as cruel rulers over the citizens of Earth, suppressing dissent with brutality, policing using violence and/or using invasive surgery to transform humans into slaves. Throughout the games, the player primarily battles transformed humans as well as synthetic and mechanical enemies that are the product of Combine technology. In addition to their role within the Half-Life series, the Combine have been adapted for machinima productions and one Combine character type has been made into plush toys by Valve.

Design

Certain elements of the Combine's appearance, such as that of the Advisor, are inspired by the works of Frank Herbert. The towering Striders seen throughout Half-Life 2 and its subsequent episodes are based directly on the Martian tripods of the H.G. Wells novel The War of the Worlds, where said Martians invade Victorian England, using the tripods as their main "weapon". The name "Combine" itself is a tribute to Ken Kesey's novel One Flew Over the Cuckoo's Nest, which features a collection of authorities which mechanistically manipulate and process individuals.

During Half-Life 2s development, various concepts for Combine non-player characters were cut. Female Combine Assassins, similar to black ops Assassins featured in the first game, were planned but later abandoned, although they appear in the Half-Life 2: Survivor arcade game. Another non-player character, the Cremator, was conceptualized as a Combine laborer who cleaned the streets of bodies after a battle with an acid gun and although removed from the game, its head was featured on a desk in Eli Vance's laboratory in Black Mesa East. Other cuts included a variety of alien Combine soldiers that would have complemented the trans-human soldiers in the game and a number of synthetic combat machines. Many of Half-Life 2s Combine characters went through multiple redesigns; the Combine Overwatch soldier was subjected to at least twelve redesigns before the final appearance was settled on.

Actress Ellen McLain provides the voice for the Combine Overwatch announcer and dispatcher in Half-Life 2 and its episodic expansions  and their virtual reality prequel Half-Life: Alyx. Combine soldiers in Half-Life: Alyx are voiced by multiple actors including Rich Sommer, Isaac C. Singleton Jr., Jason Vande Brake, Michael Schwalbe, Rajia Baroudi, and Rick Zieff.

Attributes

Society
Little is revealed of the Combine's role outside of Earth, but dialogue in Half-Life 2 states that they control worlds of various dimensions and inhabited by a range of species. The Combine occupation of Earth, however, is shown to be a brutal police state. In City 17, an Eastern European city, Civil Protection units are seen frequently, often conducting random searches of apartment blocks, interrogating human citizens and performing random acts of police brutality. The military Overwatch forces of the Combine are shown attacking human resistance bases in an effort to further solidify peace in the urban centers. Citizens themselves are all clad in blue uniforms and live in designated apartment blocks. Citizens move around to different cities or locales at the Combine's will using passenger trains. Vortigaunts, enemy alien creatures from the original Half-Life, are revealed to have also been enslaved, and are observed in various jobs such as janitors. According to the coffee table book Half-Life 2: Raising the Bar, the Combine are draining the Earth's oceans and resources to be used on other Combine worlds; while in both City 17's waterways and the outskirt's coastal shores, water levels are severely reduced.

The heart of the Combine's command over Earth in Half-Life 2 is the Citadel, an enormous structure of Combine construction reaching tens of thousands of feet into the sky and delving deep underground. Located within City 17, the Citadel serves as the primary headquarters of the Combine, housing Combine Advisors and the office of Earth's administrator, Dr. Wallace Breen. Breen, a puppet ruler, is frequently seen on large screens around the city from which he spreads propaganda and various announcements. The Citadel projects an energy field that is able to prevent human reproduction, as well as a field that keeps dangerous alien fauna out of the city. In addition, the Citadel contains a trans-dimensional teleporter which allows the Combine to travel between their native universe and Earth. The Citadel also contains construction facilities for various synthetic Combine combat machines.

Depiction
The Combine is composed of various species and machines. The most commonly encountered enemies throughout Half-Life 2 and its expansions are the transhuman Overwatch soldiers and human Civil Protection officers. In addition, a variety of combat machines appear, ranging from APCs and helicopter gunships to a giant 'smart wall' which encloses occupied cities and gradually destroys anything in its path, as well as a number of weaponized alien 'synths'.

Advisors

Advisors are large larvae-like aliens which are virtually featureless, with no visible eyes, ears or limbs, though they do possess an eye-like mechanical device attached to the left side of their heads, and detachable mechanical arms. Their faces are covered by a respirator, which is able to lift to reveal a mouth-like orifice from which they can extend a long and flexible proboscis. With this, they can examine objects, or attack and kill other creaturs. Advisors appear to be feeding upon their victim during their attacks. It is implied that Advisors are the Combine's ruling class, with Breen answering directly to them. Although Advisors are usually seen in protective pods guarded by Combine soldiers, they also possess psychokinesis with which they are able to float through the air and immobilize other creatures so that their proboscis can examine victims without interference. Their appearance was based on the Guild Navigators from the 1984 film Dune.

Civil Protection

The Civil Protection is the Combine's primary law enforcement agency on Earth, whose ranks are drawn from unmodified, volunteering humans. Commonly referred to as "metrocops", Civil Protection personnel wear light body armor and face masks which resemble a modified PMK gas mask. They also have voice modifiers, masking their normal voices. They typically carry electroshock batons, named Stunsticks ingame and USP Match pistols, and are occasionally equipped with Heckler & Koch MP7 submachine guns. The Civil Protection are frequently brutal in their methods, keeping the local populace in line via intimidation and violence. Interrogations, inspections, raids, random beatings, summary executions and acts of police brutality are all used as a means of policing their jurisdictions; the Civil Protection's methods are justified by their role as "protectors of the civilians well-being". On the outskirts of City 17, the Civil Protection carry out constant patrols for escapees from the city. Civil Protection personnel are in constant contact with the Combine's Overwatch headquarters, which issues them objectives and situation updates. Upon the death of Civil Protection personnel, their armor detects that its wearer is no longer alive and automatically informs the Overwatch of the fatality.

Overwatch

The Overwatch is the primary Combine military on Earth. It consists of biomechanically enhanced humans, who wear heavy body armor and gas masks and are equipped with MP7 submachine guns, Franchi SPAS-12 shotguns, Walther WA 2000 sniper rifles and pulse rifles. The markings on their uniforms signify each individual soldier's assignment and rank. Elite Overwatch soldiers wear bright white armor with one-eyed helmets and can fire a ball of energy from their pulse rifle, while the rank-and-file wear blue armor. Soldiers wielding shotguns wear similar outfits to other Overwatch troops but are equipped with uniforms coloured brown and helmets with orange (instead of blue) eyes. Overwatch soldiers typically operate in small groups of four to six using infantry tactics and grenades to flush out and flank the player. They occasionally provide support to Combine synths, and often travel to areas by use of gunships and armoured personnel carriers. Overwatch soldiers utilize two-way radios to communicate with each other and with headquarters. The Overwatch are usually encountered outside City 17, and only appear in the city near the end of the game. In Half Life: Alyx, there are four new Overwatch soldiers. They also travel in groups, usually of four, called Stabilisation Teams. Combine Grunts are the main fighting force, and are equipped with Pulse SMGs and have a red gas tank on their backs, which can be shot at. They wear white armour, with black and yellow markings. They usually stay back, firing single, accurate bursts, and will fire automatic when you are close to them. Combine Ordinals are the leaders of Stabilisation Teams, are equipped with Pulse Rifles. They also carry a radio on their back. Their armour is white, with yellow markings. Their strategy is also to stay far from the player, firing single shots, and only fire fully automatic when you get close enough. Combine Chargers (or Wallhammers) are heavy units, equipped with large shotguns, and stunsticks, but the stunstick is not used ingame. They also possess arm mounted hard-light shields, with which they can easily push forward, blocking direct fire. They wear grey armour, with large shoulder pads, and various blue markings. Combine Suppressors are interesting soldiers. Their mask is unlike any other seen in the series. They also wear heavy armour, and it is coloured grey, with various orange markings. All units have the Combine insignia on their armour. The Suppressor's job is also to stay back, and, as their name suggests, suppress the player with their heavy machine gun. Continuous fire causes the machine gun to overheat, which allows the player an opportunity to return fire.

Combine technology
The Combine use a large array of science fiction technologies. They have access to teleportation technology, which transports them between dimensions. However, their teleporter technology is restrictive in comparison to that developed by Eli Vance, Isaac Kleiner and Judith Mossman in that it cannot be used to teleport to other locations within the same dimension. Throughout the games, various futuristic computer consoles, doors, power sources and weapon emplacements are encountered. In addition, the Combine employ the use of robotic drones called city scanners, to observe the citizens of Earth. They monitor individuals and takes photographs, while combat drones called shield scanners are used to dop mines. Civil Protection makes use of smaller drones called manhacks, which are equipped with razor-sharp rotating blades to attack targets with laceration injuries. These are often deployed in closed-in areas. The Combine also use two types of land mines; hopper mines throw themselves into the air and detonate when an enemy is detected nearby, while spherical rollermines roll towards vehicles or enemies, attach themselves and deliver electrical attacks. Combine technology is also used to transform humans into Overwatch soldiers or stalkers, deformed and mutilated humans with no memory of their past selves who act as slaves and maintenance workers in Combine facilities. Transformation into a Stalker is considered among the Combine's worst punishments for dissidents.

Militarily, the Combine make use of both synthetics, creatures augmented with machinery, and traditional machines such as armored personnel carriers and attack helicopters. The most prominent of the synthetic machines are the insect-like gunships; and Striders,  armored creatures that walk on three legs, armed with a high powered cannon and head-mounted pulse turret. In Episode Two, the Hunter, a smaller equivalent to the Strider, is introduced. These tripodal assault machines fire explosive flechettes at targets and are small enough to maneuver indoors. Other synths are seen near the end of the Half-Life 2, though their roles are not elaborated on. Sentry turrets are also used by the Combine. The Combine often uses headcrabs as a method of bioterrorism against dissidents and refugees, firing artillery shells loaded with the creatures into areas and allowing them to infest said area.

Appearances

Half-Life series
According to the backstory presented during Half-Life 2, the Combine appear on Earth after the death of the Nihilanth, the boss character at the end of Half-Life. The death of the Nihilanth, a powerful creature controlling the dimensional rip between Xen and the Black Mesa Research Facility on Earth, causes the rip to worsen, resulting in "portal storms" which spread the hostile wildlife of Xen across Earth. The Combine manipulate this tear in the spacetime continuum, widening it to allow access to Earth from their dimension. When sufficiently wide enough, the Combine launched an invasion in force. Earth is rapidly defeated in a war lasting seven hours (the title is a reference to the Soviet military exercise Щит-82; "Seven-Hour Nuclear War"). Earth's surrender is negotiated by Wallace Breen, administrator of the Black Mesa Research Facility at the time who discovered a means of communicating with the Combine, who is then made the Combine's puppet ruler of Earth, with City 17 as his base of operations.

The Combine's first appearance is in Half-Life 2. Through the early stages of the game, Combine Civil Protection units pursue Gordon Freeman through City 17 after his presence is revealed to Wallace Breen. Due to Freeman's actions in Half-Life, Breen sees Freeman as a major threat. As Freeman flees the city, Civil Protection units raid the resistance base of Black Mesa East and capture resistance leader Eli Vance, who is transferred to holding facilities at Nova Prospekt. Freeman and Vance's daughter Alyx break into the facility to rescue him, but Eli is teleported to the Combine Citadel by double agent Judith Mossman. The strike against Nova Prospekt prompts a revolution by the citizens of Earth and heavy street fighting takes place. Freeman battles Combine Overwatch to infiltrate the Citadel but is captured and taken to Breen. With suppressing the revolution failing, Breen flees to the Citadel's trans-dimensional teleporter to escape. Freeman destroys the teleporter's reactor before Breen can flee, causing a large explosion that destroys the top of the Citadel.

In Episode One, the destruction of the teleporter has isolated Combine forces on Earth, and its primary reactor has begun to melt down. This forces Gordon Freeman and Alyx Vance to journey back into the critically damaged Citadel to stabilize its reactor while the city's inhabitants are evacuated. The Combine forces, however, instead attempt to accelerate the meltdown in order to contact their native dimension for reinforcements. After Alyx acquires an encrypted copy of the message to be sent, Overwatch forces desperately attempt to stop the pair from escaping the city, spurred on by Combine Advisors. As the pair escape on a train at the end of the game, the Citadel detonates and destroys City 17.

Episode Two opens with Alyx and Freeman learning a superportal to the Combine dimension has formed in the Citadel's place, progressing to a stage where the Combine can send reinforcements. They also discover that Alyx's encrypted data from the Citadel can reverse the portal, and so traverse the countryside to deliver the packet to another resistance headquarters at White Forest. As they progress, Combine Advisors have escaped the Citadel's destruction, and remaining Combine forces are regrouping, albeit under attacks by Vortigaunts. Aware of the resistance's plans to close the superportal, the Combine attack White Forest in force, but are repelled. The superportal is destroyed after the resistance launch a satellite containing the appropriate data. Two Advisors attack Freeman, Alyx and Eli Vance, and kill Eli before being driven off.

The Combine are again the primary antagonist in the prequel Half-Life: Alyx, taking place between Half-Life and Half-Life 2. The game focuses on the efforts of Alyx Vance, her father Eli, and fellow resistance member Russell, as they attempt to infiltrate a massive Combine vault, believing it possesses a weapon that they could use to weaken the Combine occupation on Earth. After navigating through various quarantined zones of City 17 and rescuing Eli, they discover that the vault is constructed not to hold a weapon, but as a prison, which they deduce to be holding Gordon Freeman. Alyx infiltrates the Vault and learns that it does not imprison Freeman, but is instead harboring the mysterious G-Man, who shows Alyx a glimpse of Eli's death in the future and offers her a chance to prevent it, which she accepts, before placing her in stasis.

Appearances in other media
The use of sandbox applications like Garry's Mod have allowed for Combine non-player characters to be used in a variety of webcomics and machinima productions. The Combine are also referenced in the Portal series. In one webcomic, Concerned, the Combine are portrayed as a highly bureaucratic and often inept organization. One issue shows a Civil Protection briefing for attempting to capture the comic's protagonist Gordon Frohman, in which officers are instructed to cluster around explosive barrels, seek cover on unstable structures and rappel down from bridges in front of fast moving vehicles. In another example, the machinima series Combine Nation follows Civil Protection officers in a similar style to police procedural documentaries. The officers perform their duties with various twists, such as the team's medical officer having an obsession with adhesive bandages and the legal consultant, an Overwatch soldier, favoring dramatic entries, such as throwing flashbangs, which often backfire on him. Another web series, called The Combine, parodies the TV show The Office. This series attempts to portray the combine as an intergalactic corporation that suffers from everyday office issues and problems. One episode shows the soldiers attempting to bypass a webfilter so they can watch videos online instead of working. Other media portray the Combine with more serious overtones, such as the live-action video The Combine Interview, which parodies an interview with Tom Cruise discussing Scientology. The video, described by ActionTrip as "eerie, to say the least" and by both Joystiq and Kotaku as "creepy", instead presents an interview with a Civil Protection officer discussing the Combine's rule of Earth, adapting Cruise's words to fit the Combine theme. PC Gamer UK noted that "the suggestion, of course, is that Scientology's purpose or self-image in some way resembles that of the homogenizing intergalactic murderous alien collective".

Cultural impact

Merchandise
The Combine have inspired the creation of several items of merchandise for the Half-Life series. A plush toy was created by Valve, based on the synthetic tripod Hunters introduced in Episode Two. Sold and distributed via Valve's online store, the toy was released in February 2008. In addition, Valve has produced t-shirts depicting the Combine's idea of humanity's evolution, from ape to Combine Overwatch soldier mirroring The March of Progress, and a lithograph displaying twelve pieces of concept art for the Combine soldier.

Reception

The Combine have received a positive reaction from critics. 1UP.com praised the "epic feel" built up by the Combine and their harsh rule of City 17 in Half-Life 2, stating that this created "a world governed by newspeak, decorated with urban decay, and lacking any hope". GameSpot echoed this praise, saying that the "vision of a dystopian police state is chillingly effective". PC Zone described the appearance of the Combine's soldiers as "stormtrooper-like", but although stating that overall the artificial intelligence for the game was "extremely competent", the Combine non-player characters "could have used better survival instincts", citing their reluctance to take cover and tendency to charge at the player and into a shotgun blast.

A number of reviews of Episode One were disappointed by the lack of new characters for the Combine, although GameSpot praised the improved AI for Combine soldiers and the addition of new abilities, such as rappelling down buildings. The addition of the Hunter in Episode Two was particularly well received by critics; Computer and Video Games stated that they were challenging to fight and were "a very welcome addition" to the series, while IGN stated that the Hunters were "impressively designed... [they are] sleek and powerful all at once and reek of malicious alien intelligence." The Combine were also ranked at #22 in ''IGNs 'Top 100 Videogame Villains' list.

References

Notes

External links
 The Combine on Combine OverWiki, an external wiki

Half-Life characters
Bioterrorism in fiction
Cyborg characters in video games
Fictional extraterrestrial life forms
Fictional governments
Fictional soldiers in video games
Galactic empires
Totalitarianism in fiction
Video game antagonists
Video game characters introduced in 2004